Ishgah (also Romanized as Īshgāh) is a village in Rudboneh Rural District, Rudboneh District, Lahijan County, Gilan Province, Iran. At the 2006 census, its population was 535, in 165 families.

References 

Populated places in Lahijan County